Museum of Architecture or Architecture Museum may refer to:

 Archizoom (EPFL), Lausanne, Switzerland
 Canadian Centre for Architecture, Montreal, Canada
 German Architecture Museum, Frankfurt, Germany
 Latvian Museum of Architecture, Riga, Latvia
 Museo de la Arquitectura Ponceña, Ponce, Puerto Rico
 Museo Nacional de Arquitectura, Mexico City, Mexico
 Museum for Architectural Drawing, Berlin, Germany
 Museum of Architecture, Wrocław, Poland
 Museum of Finnish Architecture, Helsinki, Finland
 Museum of Estonian Architecture, Tallinn, Estonia
 Museum of Puerto Rican Architecture, Ponce, Puerto Rico, USA
 Netherlands Architecture Institute, Rotterdam, Netherlands
 Shchusev State Museum of Architecture, Moscow, Russia
 Swedish Centre for Architecture and Design, Stockholm, Sweden
 Swiss Architecture Museum, Basel, Switzerland
 Ultra Architecture Museum, Seoul, South Korea
 Victoria and Albert Museum, London, England

See also 
 Architecture and Design Museum, Los Angeles, USA
 Architekturzentrum Wien, Vienna, Austria
 Bauhaus Archive, Berlin, Germany
 Bauhaus Museum, Weimar, Weimar, Germany
 Beijing Planning Exhibition Hall, Beijing, China
 Edo-Tokyo Open Air Architectural Museum, Tokyo, Japan
 Museum of Domestic Design and Architecture, London, England
 Museum of Folk Architecture and Life, Uzhhorod, Ukraine
 National Building Museum, Washington, D.C., United States
 National Museum of Art, Architecture and Design, Oslo, Norway
 New Bauhaus Museum Weimar, Weimar, Germany
 Open-air Museum of the Łódź Wooden Architecture, Łódź, Poland
 Shanghai Urban Planning Exhibition Center, Shanghai, China
 National Building Arts Center, St. Louis, Missouri, United States